Dahini - The Witch is a 2022 Indian Hindi language supernatural thriller film written, and directed by Rajesh Touchriver; produced by Sunitha Krishnan, and Pradeep Narayanan. The film stars Tannishtha Chatterjee, J. D. Chakravarthy, and Sruthy Jayan in pivotal roles. 

Upon release the film received widely positive reviews whilst receiving international honors, such as "Best Feature Film" at the Titan International Film Festival, "Best International Feature Film" at the Pacific Beach International Festival and nominated at the Swedish International Film Festival.

Plot
The plot exploits witch hunting tradition in eastern India.

Cast
Tannishtha Chatterjee as Kamala
J. D. Chakravarthy as Pratap
Sruthy Jayan as Pallavi
Badrul Islam as Chuniya
Mohd Ashique Hussain as Ojha
Angana Roy as Uma
Riju Bajaj

References

External links
 

2022 films
2022 horror films
Indian supernatural horror films
Demons in film
The Devil in film
Films about religious violence in India
Films about women in India
Indian dark fantasy films
Films about social issues in India
Films about dysfunctional families
Films about shapeshifting
Films about human rights
Films set on farms
Films set in forests
Films set in Odisha
Films shot in Odisha
Films based on fantasy works
Films based on Indian folklore
Indian neo-noir films
2020s Hindi-language films
Films about Satanism
Films about witchcraft
2022 independent films